The Creative & Media Studio School is a studio school located at the Netherhall Learning Campus in Huddersfield, in the English county of West Yorkshire, England.

The school was established in 2010. The school was initially housed in the premises of the other schools in the Netherhall Federation; however a dedicated building has been completed and was officially opened on 15 November 2013.

School specialisms include Drama, Music, Textiles, Graphics, Fashion and Media, with qualifications at GCSE, BTEC or A Level.

References

External links
Creative & Media Studio School official website

Studio schools
Secondary schools in Kirklees
Educational institutions established in 2010
2010 establishments in England
Arts organizations established in 2010